Leipzig-Dresden Railway may refer to:

 Leipzig–Dresden Railway Company, a former railway company in Saxony, Germany
 Leipzig–Dresden railway, the first long-distance railway line in Germany, which was built by the Leipzig–Dresden Railway Company